The 1975 Army Cadets football team represented the United States Military Academy in the 1975 NCAA Division I football season. Led by head coach Homer Smith, the team finished with a record of 2–9. The Cadets offense scored 165 points, while the defense allowed 337 points.

Schedule

Roster
Clennie Brundidge, Fr.
QB Leamon Hall, So.
RB Jeffery Washington Fr.
RB Gregory King So.
QB Hank Drought, Fr.

Season

Army–Navy Game
On November 29, Navy beat Army by a score of 30–6.

References

Army
Army Black Knights football seasons
Army Cadets football